This is a list of films produced in Taiwan ordered by year of release. For an alphabetical list of Taiwanese films see :Category:Taiwanese films

1980

1981

1982

1983

1984

1985

1986

1987

1988

1989

References

External links
Taiwanese film at the Internet Movie Database

1980s in Taiwan
Taiwan
1980s